Duncan Fraser is a British-born Canadian actor. He is most noted for his performance in the 1985 film Overnight, for which he was a Genie Award nominee for Best Supporting Actor at the 7th Genie Awards in 1986, and his regular role as Staff Sgt. Regan in Da Vinci's Inquest, for which he was a Gemini Award nominee for Best Supporting Actor in a Drama Series at the 15th Gemini Awards in 2000.

Early life and education 
Born in Manchester, England, Fraser planned to study aeronautical engineering at the University of London, but switched to psychology after finding engineering too technical and mathematical.

Career 
Following university, Fraser travelled around the world for a number of years, before settling in the Vancouver area in 1974 and working as an actor. He spent a number of years as director of the Nanaimo Theatre Festival, and as associate director of Vancouver's Fend Players theatre company.

Fraser was also known for his regular television roles as Zack Denny in Bordertown, Mac McDougall in The Heights, Colonel Munro in Hawkeye, and Brian Brewster in Hope Island.

Filmography

Film

Television

References

External links

20th-century British male actors
20th-century Canadian male actors
21st-century British male actors
21st-century Canadian male actors
British male film actors
British male stage actors
British male television actors
British emigrants to Canada
Canadian male film actors
Canadian male stage actors
Canadian male television actors
Male actors from Manchester
Male actors from Vancouver
Living people
Year of birth missing (living people)